The men's compound archery individual competition at the 2017 World Games took place from 29 to 30 July 2017 at the AWF Witelona in Wrocław, Poland.

Results

Ranking round

Competition bracket

References 

Men's individual compound